FC Krylia Sovetov-2 Samara is a Russian football team based in Samara. It is the farm club for FC Krylia Sovetov Samara. It played in the Russian Second Division in 2000. For 2017–18 season, it received the license for the third-tier Russian Professional Football League, with Konoplyov football academy alumni acting as the base for the squad. After the parent club was promoted back to the Russian Premier League for the 2018–19 season, Krylia Sovetov-2 dropped out of professional football. After Krylia Sovetov were relegated from RPL at the end of the 2019–20 season, Krylia Sovetov-2 were registered for PFL once more for the 2020–21 season. Following Krylia Sovetov's return to the top tier after one season, Krylia Sovetov-2 did not register for the 2021–22 PFL season.

References

External links
  Official VK page

Association football clubs established in 2000
Football clubs in Russia
Sport in Samara, Russia
2000 establishments in Russia
PFC Krylia Sovetov Samara